Wilhelm Friedrich von Gleichen-Rußwurm (1717–1783), Stablemaster of the Margrave of Bayreuth, was a German biologist. In 1778 he developed a process of staining micro-organisms with indigo and carmine (Abhandlung über die Saamen - und Infusionsthierchen, und über die Erzeugung, nebst mikroskopischen Beobachtungen des Saamens der Thiere in verschiedenen Infusionen - Treatise on seed and infusoria, and their production, along with microscopic observations of the semen of animals in different suspensions).

The fern genus Gleichenia was named in his honour.

Publications
Drosophila : a contribution to its morphology and development - W. F. von Gleichen, 1764 A description of Drosophila melanogaster edited in 1764 by Johann Christoph Keller (1737-1796) who also engraved the accompanying copper-plate.
Dissertation sur la génération, les animalcules spermatiques, et ceux d'infusions, avec des observations microscopiques sur le sperme et sur différentes infusions - Gleichen-Russwurm, Wilhelm Friedrich, Freiherr von, 1717-1783
Auserlesene mikroskopische Entdeckungen bey den Pflanzen, Blumen und Blüthen, Insekten und andern Merkwürdigkeiten : mit illuminirten Kupfertafeln - Nürnberg, 1777
Von Entstehung, Bildung, Umbildung Und Bestimmung Des Erdkörpers... 
Mikroskopische Untersuchungen und Beobachtungen der geheimen Zeugungstheile der Pflanzen in ihren Blüten, und der in denselben befindlichen Insekten - Nürnberg, Raspe, 1790

References

German naturalists